Cao Cao (155–220) was a Chinese warlord of the late Eastern Han dynasty who laid the foundation for the state of Cao Wei in the Three Kingdoms period.

Cao Cao may also refer to:
 Cao Cao (album), album by singer JJ Lin
 Cao Cao (TV series), a 2013 Chinese TV series
 Cao Cao (actor) (born 1973), Jonathan Kos-Read, American actor in film and television in China
Caocao:

 Caocao Chuxing ride hailing service owned by Geely